Henry Castellanos Garzón, aka "Romaña", (born March 20, 1965) was a Colombian guerrilla commander of the Revolutionary Armed Forces of Colombia. Castellanos Garzón was a member of the Estado Mayor and the Commander of several Eastern Bloc of the FARC-EP fronts.

According to the United States government, Castellanos Garzón has been involved in drug trafficking for the FARC since the mid-1980s.

The U.S. Department of State is offering a reward of up to US$2.5 million for information leading to his arrest and/or conviction.

Castellanos Garzón is also wanted by Colombian authorities for the kidnapping of the former mayor of Soacha, Cundinamarca and his brother in 1997. Both brothers were later freed.

Reported death in September 2010
On 23 September 2010, the Colombian press reported that Romaña was killed on 22 September during "Operation Sodom"- the same military operation that was credited with killing FARC commander Mono Jojoy. Colombian authorities could not confirm his death nor find his body.

In May 2011, Colombian president Juan Manuel Santos confirmed on his presidential website that Romana survived the attack.

In October 2014, Romana went to Cuba as part of the negotiating team involved in successful peace talks with the Colombian government.

References

Living people
Members of FARC
1965 births